The 1968 Oakland A’s season was the franchise's 68th season and its first in Oakland, California. The team finished sixth in the American League with a record of 82 wins and 80 losses, placing them 21 games behind the eventual World Series champion Detroit Tigers.  The Athletics' paid attendance for the season was 837,466.

The 1968 season represented a tremendous breakthrough for the Athletics organization. The campaign resulted in their first winning record since 1952, when they were still located in Philadelphia. Moreover, the Athletics' 82 wins marked a 20-win increase over the prior year's 62–99 mark. The team's young core of Jim "Catfish" Hunter, Joe Rudi, Bert Campaneris, Reggie Jackson, Sal Bando, Gene Tenace, and Rick Monday began to gel; all of these young players (with the exception of Monday, who would be traded in 1971 for pitcher Ken Holtzman) would power the Athletics' forthcoming 1970's dynasty.

Offseason

Relocation to Oakland 
On October 18, 1967, American League owners at last gave Charles O. Finley permission to move the Athletics from Kansas City, Missouri to Oakland for the 1968 season. According to some reports, AL President Joe Cronin promised Finley that he could move the team after the 1967 season as an incentive to sign the new lease with Municipal Stadium in Kansas City. The move came in spite of approval by voters in Jackson County, Missouri of a bond issue for a brand new baseball stadium (the eventual Kauffman Stadium) to be completed in 1973. During their 13-year stay in Kansas City, the Athletics were arguably one of the worst teams in baseball history, finishing last or next-to-last place in 10 of those years. Their overall record was 829–1,224, for a winning percentage of .404.
October 22, 1967: Charlie Finley arrived at the Oakland Airport and was greeted by 400 fans. Finley had signed a 20-year lease ($125,000 per year or 5% of gate revenues if attendance passed 1.45 million a season) to bring the A's to Oakland.

Front office
Finley had persuaded Joe DiMaggio to take a position as Executive Vice President and consultant. DiMaggio needed two more years of baseball service to qualify for the league's maximum pension allowance. In addition, Finley signed Phil Seghi to run the A's farm system (of note, Seghi signed Pete Rose to his first major league contract).

Notable transactions 
 October 19, 1967: Andy Kosco was purchased by the Athletics from the Minnesota Twins.
 January 27, 1968: 1968 Major League Baseball Draft (January Draft) notable picks:
Round 1: George Hendrick
Round 2: Reggie Sanders
Secondary Phase:
Round 2: Ray Peters (did not sign)

Regular season

Opening day
The first game in Oakland A's history took place on the road, on April 10, 1968, against the Baltimore Orioles at Memorial Stadium. The Orioles defeated the Athletics, 3–1, behind starting pitcher Tom Phoebus and the efforts of three relievers. Jim "Catfish" Hunter started for Oakland and took the loss, with Reggie Jackson hitting the first home run in Oakland's MLB history to account for the A's only run, the blow coming in the eighth inning. Seven days later, the Athletics made their home debut, also against the Orioles, and were again defeated, this time by a 4–1 score with Dave McNally besting Lew Krausse Jr. before 50,164 at Oakland–Alameda County Coliseum.

Starting lineup, April 10, 1968

Hunter's perfect game

On May 8 against the Minnesota Twins, Hunter pitched the first regular season perfect game in the American League since 1922, but the paid attendance in Oakland was only 6,298 on a Wednesday night. The game was scoreless until the bottom of the seventh when Hunter squeezed the first run in. In the eighth, he drove in two more with a bases-loaded single, and ended with three hits and three RBI. Hunter was inducted in the National Baseball Hall of Fame in 1987 and was the first to have his number retired by the franchise, in 1991.

Season standings

Record vs. opponents

Notable transactions 
 June 7, 1968: 1968 Major League Baseball Draft (June Draft) notable picks:
Round 1: Pete Broberg (did not sign)
Round 6: Rich Troedson (did not sign).
Round 26: John Strohmayer

Roster

Player stats

Batting

Starters by position 
Note: Pos = Position; G = Games played; AB = At bats; H = Hits; Avg. = Batting average; HR = Home runs; RBI = Runs batted in

Other batters 
Note: G = Games played; AB = At bats; H = Hits; Avg. = Batting average; HR = Home runs; RBI = Runs batted in

Pitching

Starting pitchers 
Note: G = Games pitched; IP = Innings pitched; W = Wins; L = Losses; ERA = Earned run average; SO = Strikeouts

Other pitchers 
Note: G = Games pitched; IP = Innings pitched; W = Wins; L = Losses; ERA = Earned run average; SO = Strikeouts

Relief pitchers 
Note: G = Games pitched; W = Wins; L = Losses; SV = Saves; ERA = Earned run average; SO = Strikeouts

Farm system 

Life Magazine had declared the A's  to have the best minor league system in professional baseball. Finley had spent $2.5 million on bonus contracts as a way of getting prospects to sign with his club.

LEAGUE CHAMPIONS: GCL A's

References

External links
1968 Oakland Athletics team page at Baseball Reference
1968 Oakland Athletics team page at www.baseball-almanac.com

Oakland Athletics seasons
Oakland Athletics season
1968 in sports in California